The Boss 429 Mustang is a high-performance Ford Mustang variant that was offered by Ford in 1969 and 1970.

Overview

The Boss 429 is recognized as being among some of the rarest and highly valued  muscle cars to date. In total there were 1359 original Boss 429s made. The origin of the Boss 429 was to fulfil Ford's need to homologate the 429 semi-hemispherical engine for NASCAR racing.  Ford was seeking to develop an engine that would better compete with the 426 Hemi from Chrysler in NASCAR's Grand National Division, now known as the NASCAR Cup Series. NASCAR's homologation rules required that at least 500 cars be fitted with this motor and sold to the general public. After much consideration, it was decided by Ford that the Mustang would be the car that would house this new engine.

With the release and homologation of the Dodge Charger Daytona from its rival manufacturer Dodge, the Boss 429 Mustang is solely left as a road-going version and all of its NASCAR plans were scrapped.  However, the 385 series Boss 429 engine itself was used in NASCAR until 1974 in other Ford and Mercury body platforms, and later in NHRA Pro Stock class during the 1980's, its main proponent there being Bob Glidden's championship winning Pro Stock Thunderbird.

The Boss 429 engine evolved from the Ford 385 engine. It used four-bolt main caps, a forged steel crank and forged steel connecting rods. The engine featured aluminium cylinder heads, with a semi-hemispherical type combustion chamber which Ford called the "crescent". These heads used the "dry-deck" method, meaning the coolant circuit for the block was separate from the cooling circuit for the head The "dry-deck" method of design is intended to strengthen the block by removing the open coolant jackets around the cylinder and reduce hot spots by providing more direct cooling. Each cylinder, oil passage and water passage had an individual "O" ring style seal to seal it tight. Although a head gasket is used, it only seals the cylinder for combustion so a failure at one point won't compromise the others.

The Boss 429 engine came standard with a single Holley 4-barrel carburetor rated at 735 CFM mounted on an aluminium intake manifold that flowed well for its time. 1969 cars featured a hydraulic lifter camshaft while 1970 models got a solid lifter camshaft along with an improved dual exhaust system, though rated power output stayed the same.

The Mustang's engine compartment was not wide enough to accommodate the massive Boss 429 engine, so Ford contracted with Kar Kraft of Dearborn, Michigan, to modify 4-speed Cobra Jet Mustangs to accept it. Kar Kraft was a Ford exclusive experimental facility that functioned as Vehicle Engineering for Ford's Special Vehicles. Kar Kraft had previously developed the first GT40 MKII (winner of the 1966 24 Hours of Le Mans) and designed and built the GT40 MKIV (winner of the 1967 24 Hours of Le Mans).

Production of the Boss 429 began in 1968 at the Ford Rouge plant, where front apron assemblies revised to accept the large Boss 429 engine were installed during vehicle construction. These also provided a stronger and cleaner front structure, important considerations on such a performance car, and were coupled with reworked front fenders. The cars were then shipped to Kar Kraft's new assembly plant in Brighton, Michigan for engine installation and further modifications.

Such a large big block engine made the car nose heavy. To help offset this, the battery was relocated to the trunk, and a 3/4" sway bar was added to the rear end to limit body roll. This was the first Mustang ever fitted with a rear sway bar, giving it better handling than the other large engine Mustangs of the time, making it a much more capable track car. So did an oil cooler which allowed both high RPM and endurance loads on the engine, and a manually controlled hood scoop for bringing in denser air for more thorough combustion. For better ground clearance the front spoiler was made shallower than the Boss 302's, and a 3.91 ratio rear axle came with a "Traction-Lock" limited slip differential. Other features included, color keyed dual racing mirrors, an 8,000rpm tachometer, and AM only radio.

Horsepower
Period dynamometer testing supports Ford's rating. The speed equipment manufacturer Crane Cams tested engines that were stock as manufactured, with the exception of substituting tubular headers for the stock cast iron exhaust manifolds.

Both model years featured a toned-down exterior compared to other performance Mustangs of the era (see Boss 351, Boss 302, Mach 1), in that the only external identification of the car were the Boss 429 decals on the front fenders and unique enlarged hood scoop. The rest of the car featured a very clean look that was atypical of most performance Mustangs that Ford had produced, which often emphasized appearance over its reality.
 Both the spoiler and window louvers commonly seen on 1969–1970 Mach 1's and Boss 302's were missing.

Instead, to show just how special these cars were, they were given special NASCAR identification that was placed on the driver's side door. Each car was given a "KK" number which stood for Kar Kraft. KK #1201 was the first Boss 429 and KK #2558 was the last Boss 429 made.

However, sales started to drop off for the 1970 Boss 429 Mustangs and with higher production costs, gas costs, and other internal Ford problems, it was decided that 1970 would be the last year of the Boss 429.

Today, these cars are highly sought after. As of 2008, auctions on eBay and at Barrett-Jackson have brought bids of over $375,000. In 2013 a black 1969 Ford Mustang Boss 429 Fastback (unrestored) sold for $417,000 at Mecum Auctions in Kissimmee, Florida. In 2016 a restored black 1969 Boss 429 sold for $500,000 at a Barrett-Jackson auction in Palm Beach, Florida.

1969 Model
A total of 859 Boss 429s were made by Ford in 1969, including two Cougars for the Lincoln/Mercury Race Division. All had black interiors, and came in one of five colors: Raven Black, Wimbledon White, Royal Maroon, Candy apple Red, and Black Jade). The fully functional hood scoop was the same color as the car, and noticeably larger than anything else offered on any Ford product but the two Boss 429 Cougars. This scoop would carry over to the 1970 model year but would be painted black on all cars. To this day, it is the largest factory hood scoop ever installed on a production Mustang.

All cars came with 4-speed manual transmissions. The huge engine shoehorned into even a modified Mustang front end left no room for air conditioning. Some early cars were known as "S" code cars and as such had a slightly different engine, with magnesium valve covers, NASCAR style forged internals, and close to no smog or emissions equipment. They are said to be more powerful than the later "T" and "A" code engines (which had the emissions related equipment to satisfy government regulations). The engines in some cases were removed from the cars for use in other applications such as tractor pulling, due to the extreme torque and horsepower the engine was capable of producing.

1970 Model
Ford made 499 Boss 429s in 1970. Five new exterior colors were available: Grabber Orange, Grabber Green, Grabber Blue, Calypso Coral, and Pastel Blue; and the interior was available in black or white and black. The hood scoops were all painted matte black.   A Hurst shifter was standard equipment. A dealer-installed option of a six-pack intake and three 2-barrel carburetors was made available, though very few of these were sold.

Classic Recreations produces the 1969-70 Ford licensed Boss 429 as of April 2018.

See also

 Boss 302 Mustang Trans Am muscle car Mustang variant 1969–1970.
 Classic Recreations produces a Boss 429 continuation car under Ford License as of April 2018.  Classic Recreations Boss 429

References

External links

 "1969–70 Boss 429 Mustang." The Auto Channel, 1996–2007.
 "1969 Ford Mustang Boss 429 A Profile of a Muscle Car." How Stuff Works
 "Mustangspecs.com"

Ford Mustang
Cars introduced in 1969
Muscle cars
Coupés
Rear-wheel-drive vehicles